Crossroads Plaza may refer to:
Crossroads Plaza (North Carolina)
Crossroads Plaza (Utah)